Grace Ebor (born 8 August 1977) is a retired Nigerian athlete who specialised in the middle-distance events. She won the gold medal in the 800 metres at the 2003 All-Africa Games.

She has personal best of 2:02.04 in the 800 metres (2003) and 4:28.17 in the 1500 metres (2005).

Competition record

References

Living people
1977 births
Nigerian female middle-distance runners
African Games gold medalists for Nigeria
African Games medalists in athletics (track and field)
Athletes (track and field) at the 2003 All-Africa Games
Athletes (track and field) at the 2002 Commonwealth Games
Commonwealth Games competitors for Nigeria
21st-century Nigerian women